Unreleased Tracks from Between Nothingness & Eternity is a live album by the Mahavishnu Orchestra, first released in 2011 as part of The Complete Columbia Albums Collection boxset, along with the other albums by the first line-up of the band, including The Lost Trident Sessions. As the title explains, the album contains other selections from the two Central Park shows from August 1973 from which the live album Between Nothingness and Eternity was culled.

Track listing

Tracks 3, 4 and 7 are from the August 17 show, while the rest of the tracks are from August 18.

Personnel
John McLaughlin – guitar
Jan Hammer – keyboards
Jerry Goodman – violin
Rick Laird – bass
Billy Cobham – percussion

References

Mahavishnu Orchestra albums
2011 live albums